Jyothi Meena is an Indian actress who has predominantly appeared in Tamil films. She is best remembered for her item numbers and supporting roles in Ullathai Allitha and Azhagana Naatkal.

Personal life 
Jyothi Meena was born in Chennai, Tamil Nadu, India. She is the daughter of actress Jyothi Lakshmi and her father is a camera man. Her mother died at her residence in Chennai on 8 August 2016 due to blood cancer.

Career 
She first appeared in the R. Sarathkumar's Tamil film, Ragasiya Police. She has appeared in supporting roles, notably in Ullathai Allitha, Azhagana Naatkal and Gopala Gopala. She has also appeared in item numbers alongside Ajith Kumar, Prabhu and R. Sarathkumar. She retired from acting after marriage. In October 2017, she said during an interview that she will return to acting if she can find a good character role.

Filmography

References 

Living people
Actresses in Tamil cinema
Indian film actresses
Year of birth missing (living people)
Actresses in Malayalam cinema
Actresses in Telugu cinema
Actresses in Kannada cinema